The 1995 Ford International Championships of Spain was a women's tennis tournament played on outdoor clay courts at the Real Club de Tenis Barcelona in Barcelona in Spain that was part of Tier II of the 1995 WTA Tour. It was the 14th edition of the tournament and was held from April 25 through April 30, 1995.

Finals

Singles

 Arantxa Sánchez Vicario defeated  Iva Majoli 5–7, 6–0, 6–2
 It was Sánchez Vicario's 3rd title of the year and the 60th of her career.

Doubles

 Arantxa Sánchez Vicario /  Larisa Savchenko defeated  Mariaan de Swardt /  Iva Majoli 7–5, 4–6, 7–5
 It was Sánchez Vicario's 4th title of the year and the 61st of her career. It was Savchenko's 2nd title of the year and the 53rd of her career.

External links
 WTA Tournament Profile

 
Ford
1995
Ford